Brillstein Entertainment Partners (formerly known as Brillstein/Grey Entertainment and Brillstein/Grey Communications) is a talent management firm and television production company formed by the 1986 addition of Brad Grey to The Brillstein Company, founded by Bernie Brillstein in 1969.

The Brillstein Company 
Bernie Brillstein formed The Brillstein Company in 1969, where he continued to manage stars and develop television programming, a career he began in the fabled mailroom of the William Morris Agency. He produced such popular television hits as Hee Haw, The Muppet Show, and Saturday Night Live.

Brillstein managed Saturday Night Live cast members Gilda Radner, John Belushi, and Lorne Michaels, as well as Jim Henson (of The Muppets fame) and Paul Fusco (voice and operator of ALF).  Productions for television included ALF: The Animated Series and Normal Life.

In 1986, Lorimar-Telepictures bought out The Brillstein Company, whereas they would have to transform it into an independently operated and management unit of the studio.

The company became Brillstein Entertainment Partners when Brad Grey left the company to become the head of Paramount Pictures. It is now headed by Jonathan Liebman, Marc Gurvitz, and Cynthia Pett.

Film productions 

 The Blues Brothers
 Dragnet

 Ghostbusters
 Ghostbusters II

Brillstein-Grey Entertainment 
In 1984, Brillstein met Brad Grey at a television convention in San Francisco. In 1986, the two formed a production company, Brillstein-Grey Entertainment, which packaged programming and managed talent.

In 1994, Brillstein-Grey had reached a deal with Capital Cities/ABC to start Brillstein-Grey Communications.

Film productions 

 Bulletproof
 The Cable Guy
 Happy Gilmore (Adam Sandler)

 The Replacement Killers
 Scary Movie 2
 Screwed

 The Wedding Singer
 What Planet Are You From?
 The Black Prince

Television productions 

 For American Broadcasting Company (ABC)
 Politically Incorrect with Bill Maher
 The Dana Carvey Show
 For Home Box Office (HBO)
 The Larry Sanders Show (Garry Shandling, Rip Torn, Jeffrey Tambor)
 The Sopranos (James Gandolfini, Edie Falco, Lorraine Bracco)
 Mr. Show with Bob and David
 Def Comedy Jam (1991-1997)
 For NBC and ABC
 The Naked Truth
 The Jeff Foxworthy Show (Jeff Foxworthy)* For National Broadcasting Company (NBC)
 NewsRadio (Phil Hartman, Jon Lovitz)
 Just Shoot Me! (David Spade)
 The Awesome Show (Chris Hardwick)
 Black Tie Affair
 For Showtime
 It's Garry Shandling's Show (Garry Shandling)

 For WB Television Network (WB)
 The Steve Harvey Show (Steve Harvey)
 Alright Already
 For Columbia Broadcasting System (CBS)
 Good Sports (Ryan O'Neal, Farrah Fawcett)
 Normal Life
 For Disney+
 The Mighty Ducks: Game Changers (2021)

 For Apple TV+
 Central Park

Miscellaneous 
The new management company Eric Murphy joins in HBO's Entourage is based on Brillstein Entertainment, as well as the character Murray Berenson based on the company's founder Bernie Brillstein.

Brillstein sold his shares in the company to Universal Pictures in 1996, giving Grey, his one time protégé, full rein over operations. In 1999, Universal sold Brillstein's shares to Grey, and the company's television unit was subsequently rechristened Brad Grey Television as a result. Also, Brad Grey Television struck a deal with Columbia TriStar Television to produce and distribute TV shows. Grey sold his interest in the company in 2005 due to his succeeding Sherry Lansing as Chief executive officer of Paramount Pictures, which created a conflict of interest. Briefly, it became Basic Entertainment, before reverting to its original name in 2000.

Several shows by the company now have ancillary rights owned by NBCUniversal Television and Streaming. Some of these shows are distributed by Sony Pictures Television in North America.

References

External links 
 Official website
 Variety.com

Film production companies of the United States
Television production companies of the United States